KKG may refer to:
 Gösgen Nuclear Power Plant, in Switzerland
 Grafenrheinfeld nuclear power plant, in Germany
 Kappa Kappa Gamma
 Kingdom Kerry Gaels, a Gaelic football club in London
 Mabaka Valley Kalinga language